Renault India Private Limited is a wholly owned subsidiary of Renault, France and currently offers three models in the Indian market:  budget car Kwid, the compact MPV Triber and the compact SUV Kiger.

History
In February 2008, Renault-Nissan Alliance signed Memorandum of Understanding with Government of Tamil Nadu to set up a manufacturing plant in Oragadam near Chennai. Work on the plant began in June later that year and was completed in a record 21 months. Renault Design India, the first vehicle design studio set up by a foreign manufacturer in India, was established in Mumbai in September 2008. The design house is integral to Renault's success in India as one of its functions is to monitor customer trends and customize global products for India. At the end of 2015, Renault has approximately 200 dealerships across India, from only 14 in 2012.

Renault received more awards in one year than any of its market competitors. Since 2012, the Renault Duster received 29 awards in India and the Renault company 34 awards.
 Indian Car of the Year (ICOTY): Duster, Car of the Year
 Autocar and Bloomberg TV: Duster, Car of the Year, Viewers' Choice, and SUV of the Year
 NDTV: Duster, Car of the Year and Compact SUV of the Year; Scala, Creative TV Commercial of the Year; Pulse, Premium Hatch of the Year; and Renault India, Car Manufacturer of the Year
 Top Gear: Duster, Compact SUV of the Year and Readers' Choice for the BBC and Times of India
 Car India: Duster, SUV of the Year
 Overdrive and CNBC-TV 18: Duster, Compact SUV of the Year
 Vicky.in, Motor Vikatan (Chennai) and Team BHP: Duster, Car of the Year
 Zigwheels and Economic Times: Duster, Car of the Year, Readers' Choice and entry-level SUV of the Year
 AutoJunction.in: Duster, Car of the Year and Utility Vehicle of the Year; Renault Pulse, SuperMini of the Year; Renault Scala, Mid-size Sedan of the Year

Operations & Sales 
In September 2008, Renault India opened its fifth global vehicle design studio in Mumbai.

In March 2010, Renault India and Nissan India opened a production facility in Chennai. Established with an initial investment of Rs 45 billion (US$990 million), the plant has a combined annual capacity to produce 480,000 vehicles.

As of September 2015, Renault India has 175 dealerships in 16 cities across 9 states and 2 Union Territories, targeting 210 outlets at the end of 2015. It quickly expanded to 190 dealerships in December 2015, thanks to the Renault Kwid success. Renault has also developed virtual showrooms and some specific phone apps. Renault currently has 270 dealership across India.

Models

Current Models

The Kwid is Renault's first sub Rs 4 lakh segment car (earlier codenamed XBA). It was fully developed in India by Gérard Detourbet and his French and Indian team. The press called it "the best in class" and it sold well.

Discontinued Models 

 Renault Fluence (2011–2017)
 Renault Koleos (2011–2017)
 Renault Pulse (2012–2018)
 Renault Scala (2012–2018)
 Renault Duster (2012–2022)
 Renault Lodgy (2015–2020)
 Renault Captur (2017–2020)

Milestones

2008
 Renault-Nissan Alliance signs Memorandum of Understanding with Government of Tamil Nadu to set up a manufacturing plant in Oragadam near Chennai
 The Renault DeSign Studio opened in Mumbai. It is one of the 5 satellite global design studios for Renault, monitoring customer trends and helping customize global products for India.
 Launch of International Logistics Network (ILN) in Pune handling components sourced from Indian suppliers for all Renault-Nissan Alliance production plants worldwide, in particular South Africa & Brazil.

2010
 Inauguration of the Renault-Nissan Alliance manufacturing facility in Chennai (investment of Rs. 4500 crores with a capacity to produce 480,000 cars per year).

2011
 Renault launches its first car in India, the Fluence. 
 Renault – Nissan Alliance manufacturing facility rolls out its 100,000th car. 
 All new Koleos global launch in India.
 Announcement of localization of the Renault K9K diesel engine.
 K9K powered Renault Pulse unveiled at the 2011 Indian Grand Prix by Formula1 drivers Mark Webber and Karun Chandok.

2012
 Renault launches the Pulse and unveils the Duster at the New Delhi Auto Expo 2012. 
 Renault Scala launched in New Delhi.
 Renault encourages employee engagement, wins the 'Inter-corporate competition RED 2012' along with team of partners Nissan, RNAIPL & RNTBCI.

2013
 Inauguration of the new warehouse for the Renault Alliance International Parts Center (IPC) in Pune, earlier working since 2008 as ILN (see above).
 Renault launched the Gang of Dusters, the official community for Duster owners.
 Since the launch of the brand in early 2011, Renault has won over 43 awards till date. The Renault Duster alone receiving 29 awards, and as previously envisaged it was a game-changer for Renault & pioneered a new segment of crossover SUV at low-to-medium cost in the Indian auto sector.
 Inauguration of the new warehouse for the Renault Alliance International Parts Center (IPC) in Chennai as a part of expansion.

2014
 Renault reaches landmark of 100,000 cars on Indian roads in less than 3 years of operation in India.

2015
 Looking to make a mark in the hatchback segment, Renault India launched the Kwid on September 24, 2015, at a starting price of Rs 2.56 lakh (ex-showroom Delhi). The most expensive variant of the car costs Rs 3.53 lakh(ex-showroom). The Renault Kwid has better features than any of its competitors.

The Kwid, based on the CMF-A platform, measures 3,679 mm in length, 1,579 mm in width, 1,478 mm in height and 2,422 mm in wheelbase. It has a ground clearance of 180 mm and a fuel tank capacity of 28-litre.

Features seen on the top-end variant include power steering, AC, front power windows, foglights, keyless entry and central locking, a 7-inch touchscreen MediaNAV system with Bluetooth, USB, AUX-in, an optional driver airbag and some design customizations.
 An updated version of the Duster is launched in October 2015.

2023
 On February 13, 2023, Renault and Nissan are planning to announce the launch of 6 new models for the Indian market.

Associations

ICICI Bank

Renault has partnered with ICICI Bank in a major marketing led cross promotional campaign that will allow the bank's database to interact with Renault and its cars.

Spellinc

Renault India' Corporate Social Responsibility (CSR) program commenced in 2013, focusing on education and road safety. It partnered with Linc Pen & Plastics Ltd for SPELLINC. The program started in September 2013 and ran until December across 8 cities (Delhi, Mumbai, Kolkata, Chennai, Bangalore, Ahmadabad, Jamshedpur and Ranchi) with a total of 1000 schools participating. The training module on road safety has been developed to be fun and interactive. It involved stage acts, singing and discussions with the students. The whole point of the operation is not only to reach students but to convert them into Road Safety ambassadors spreading the message to their schoolmates, friends and relatives.

Tour De India

Renault India supported the Tour De India 2013, a cycling event held for the first time in 2012.  The organizers are also strongly committed to promoting cycling as an alternative mobility solution to reduce carbon footprint. Tour de India 2013 was held in December with 3 races involving both competitive and entertaining cycling. Renault India was the Official Automobile Partner for the event, providing cars for the lead convoy, for the cycling teams and the Tour de India fleet in charge of recording the event.

Cricket

Renault sponsored a cricket series between India and Sri Lanka(2012) and Virat Kohli won the Man of the Series Award – a Renault Duster.  The Indian cricket team was taken for a victory lap around the stadium with Mahendra Singh Dhoni(MS Dhoni) behind the wheel of the Renault Duster. The entire cricket team was seen on the SUV while taking the victory lap.

Madras Café with John Abraham

Renault India formed a partnership with Renault Duster and John Abraham's movie 'Madras Café'.

MRF Challenge

Renault cars compete in the Formula 2000 category of the MRF Challenge. The 20 cars of the category are also powered by Renault Sport 2-litre engines. These 16-valve, 4-cylinder, 1998cc F4R 832 engines can produce a maximum power of 210 bhp at 6,500rpm and maximum torque of 220 Nm at 5500rpm.

F1 Caterham Paint Shop

The Renault workshop at Noida received a special assignment during the 2013 Airtel Indian Grand Prix, painting two Caterham F1® chassis before the Grand Prix. This routine procedure is usually completed in Europe but logistical challenges made it easier for it to be carried out in India instead.

Autocar Performance Show

Renault India participated in the Autocar Performance Show held at the MMRDA Grounds, Bandra Kurla Complex, Mumbai. It is the third time that the Renault brand was represented in the show. This event is organized by the leading Automobile magazine Autocar and features the most powerful and expensive cars and bikes available in the country as well as accessories and performance enhancing parts.

Limca Record – Renault Scala’s Mileage Run

The Renault Scala broke the Limca record for the highest fuel economy achieved in India using a stock car by achieving a real world economy of 54.15 km/L in an un-modified Renault Scala diesel sedan. The car covered the 62.28 km distance using only 1.24 litres, achieving a fuel economy of 54.15 km/L, which is 250.26% over ARAI certified figure. The distance was covered in 76 minutes.

References

External links
 

Vehicle manufacturing companies established in 2005
Manufacturing companies based in Chennai
Car manufacturers of India
Indian subsidiaries of foreign companies
2005 establishments in Tamil Nadu
Indian companies established in 2005